Tofanga is an islet which belongs to Uonukuhahake island, Tonga. It is located within the Ha'apai Group.

See also 
 List of islands and towns in Tonga

Islands of Tonga
Haʻapai